New Delhi Assembly constituency, earlier known as Gole Market Constituency, is one of the seventy Delhi assembly constituencies of Delhi in northern India.
New Delhi assembly constituency is a part of New Delhi Lok Sabha constituency. This constituency was created by reorganisation by delimitation commission in 2008. Voter-verified paper audit trail (VVPAT) was used along with EVMs in New Delhi  assembly constituency in 2013 Delhi Legislative Assembly election and 2015 Delhi Legislative Assembly election  Delhi elections.

Members of Legislative Assembly

Election results

2020 
:

2015

2013

2008

References

Assembly constituencies of Delhi
Delhi Legislative Assembly